Simon West ( born 1974) is an Australian poet. He is the author of four books of poetry and a translation and critical edition of the Italian poet Guido Cavalcanti. He lives in Melbourne, where he works as a translator and Italianist.

Life
Simon West was born in Melbourne in 1974. He grew up in Melbourne and Shepparton. He was educated at the University of Melbourne where he received the chancellor's prize in 2004 for his PhD in Italian Literature. He has lived for long periods in Turin and Rome and returns to Italy frequently. He was a lecturer in Italian studies 2007–2010 at Monash University, and he is now an honorary research fellow in the School of Languages and Linguistics at the University of Melbourne. He is married with a daughter.

Writing
West's poetry is characterised by the presence of both the Australian and Italian landscapes. For Barry Hill in The Weekend Australian "his poems invoke the mouthing of words, love affairs with vowels, a sense of the foreign word well digested. The mood of his Italian landscapes reminds me of the modem Italian poet Eugenio Montale, just as his two poems after Guido Cavalcanti, along with the imagist lyrics that follow, call up the figure of Ezra Pound, that passionate disciple of Italy." Later he writes, "West's graphic power is wonderful, so that you feel, in all of his language moments, of this world."

Martin Duwell in Australian Poetry Review has noted "a genuine fascination with the word, its sound, almost its taste in the mouth [and] that fascination continually alters the path of what might be, otherwise, predictable poems. The first poem in [First Names], 'Mushrooms' … demonstrates this theme of the tactility of language."

Reviewing the 2019 Carol and Ahoy, Duwell is puzzled why West should abandon the intense lyricism of his first three books for an “utterly different” mode of “post-Romantic ambulatory meditation”. Still, "really good poets" must be left to follow their own imperatives.

The reply to Duwell's puzzlement is given in the essays collected in West's 2019 Dear Muses?
For a long time … I felt that poetry was primarily, almost exclusively, a question of words, and that reality was as fragile as the language we use to describe it. I have come to believe this is a limiting notion. … The task of the poet is to scrutinise the actual world. … Poetry is animated by this sense of encounter.

Publications

Poetry

Anthologies

Critical edition with West's translations

Essays on poetry

Uncollected occasional reviews

Awards

 2016 The Ladder shortlisted for the Prime Minister's Literary Award for poetry
 2014 Australian Poetry Inc. Poetry Tour of Ireland
 2012 The Yellow Gum's Conversion shortlisted for the Queensland Literary Awards
 2012 Australia Council for the Arts' B. R. Whiting Studio Residency in Rome 
 2011 Arts Victoria Arts Development Grant for Literature
 2009–10 Marten Bequest Travelling Scholarship
 2007 First Names shortlisted for the NSW Premier's Literary Awards 
 2007 William Baylebridge Memorial Prize for First Names
 2007 FAW Anne Elder Award – First Names commended
 2004 University of Melbourne, Chancellor's Prize for È tant'e dritta e simigliante cosa: Translating the Poetry of Guido Cavalcanti.
 2004 Australian Young Poets Fellowship – Australian Poets Union
 2002 Emma Grollo Memorial Scholarship – University of Melbourne
 2001 H. B. Higgins Scholarship for Poetry – University of Melbourne

Video
Simon West reads in the Keats–Shelley House, Rome, 21 July 2012.

References

Australian poets
Living people
1974 births